Martin Roth may refer to:

 Sir Martin Roth (psychiatrist) (1917–2006), British psychiatrist
 Martin Roth (television writer) (1924–2000), American scriptwriter, creator of Ark II
 Martin Roth (museum director) (1955–2017), German museum director
 Martin Roth (artist) (born 1977), Austrian artist living in New York City